Houstonia is a magazine about Houston and Greater Houston, Texas, United States. It is published by SagaCity Media. The magazine's first issue released in April 2013, titled 250 Reasons to Love Houston. As of January 2016, the magazine is distributed at 800 locations in Greater Houston, including newsstands, retail outlets, and grocery stores.

The president of SagaCity, Nicole Vogel, and her brother Scott, the founding editor of Houstonia, were born and raised in Houston. The magazine was nominated for a City and Regional Magazine Award by the CRMA (City and Regional Magazine Assoc.) in 2014. It was further nominated for four CRMA awards in 2015: Reporting, Excellence in Design, Excellence in Writing, and Arts & Culture Writing; the magazine won the latter award that year. In 2016, the magazine was nominated once again for Photography and Excellence in Design in the upcoming CRMA awards to be held in May. In addition, Houstonia was given an AMA Marketer of the Year award for media. The magazine's circulation is upwards of 70,000, while its average monthly readership is over 510,000 and houstoniamag.com generally receives approximately 400,000 views per month.

Background Information
The magazine first appeared in newsstands in April 2013.

The Houstonia website has a food blog, Gastronaut. When the magazine launched, food critic Robb Walsh became an employee. In May 2013 Katharine Shilcutt, a food critic for the Houston Press, announced she was going to leave the Press and begin working for Houstonia.

The magazine also recruited Catherine Matusow from the Houston Press and Sarah Rufca from the Houston Chronicle. In sales, Marianna Dubinsky and Diane Caplan joined the team in 2014.

Houstonia uses some recurring annual issues to provide readers with current material in subjects such as real estate, dentistry, and dining. One of the best selling issues is the annual Best Restaurants cover.

On ts website, houstoniamag.com, the magazine states that its readership is composed of 35% male, 65% female, with an average household income of around $194,000 and a median age of 45. Online demographics skew younger and more male: 47% male, 53% female, with an average household income of $100,000 and a median age of 34. Houstonia also hosts editorial interns year-round. Information on internships can be found here.

In 2017 publisher Diane Caplan left to start her own company, and former senior media manager Stevi Maytubby replaced her as publisher.

Magazine Departments

The magazine's front-of-the-book section is called Ice House while others offer similarly-Houston-themed titles and Houston-centric coverage: Clutch City features local designers and decor; Bayougraphy profiles interesting Houstonians from Hakeem Olajuwon to Mireille Enos; and The Drawl captures the city's zeitgeist in illustrated form on the last page of the book. The magazine also includes a dining section, On the Table, and an arts & entertainment section, On the Town, which focuses on current shows and events in the city. Throughout all of the departments, a drawing of a native bird, the grackle, is seen messing up the design up and causing havoc in the pages.

Website Content

In addition to offering print content to buy, Houstonia also publishes a collection of weekly blogs and articles, some featured in the magazine, others website-only. These include Gastronaut, a food and dining blog; On the Town, a continuation of stories featured in the magazine's arts & entertainment section; Shop Talk, which covers everything from beauty and fashion to style and fitness; and Wanderlust, the magazine's travel blog.

See also
Magazines in Houston

References

Further reading
 Rogers, Tim. "New Magazine Launching Somewhere in Texas." D Magazine. September 24, 2012.
 Celeste, Eric. "Editors of Houstonia Magazine Find Dallas Doesn’t Suck, Have to Rethink Entire Issue." D Magazine. June 10, 2013.
 Pugh, Clifford. "It's another shakeup for Houstonia Magazine: New publisher brought in to give fledgling mag more drive." CultureMap Houston. January 31, 2014.

External links
 

2013 establishments in Texas
Local interest magazines published in the United States
City guides
Magazines established in 2013
Magazines published in Texas
Mass media in Houston
Monthly magazines published in the United States